Cameron Roach is a British television producer.

Credits include Footballers' Wives, Bad Girls, Casualty, Life on Mars , Silk, Young James Herriot and Moses Jones.

External links
 
 Maxine Peake to star in BBC1 legal drama Silk

British television producers
Living people
Year of birth missing (living people)